Major Sidney Warren Thaxter (September 8, 1839-November 10, 1908) was an American Civil War Major and Medal of Honor recipient.

Personal
Thaxter was born in Bangor, Maine. 

He married Laura May Farnham in 1866. She died in June 1880. He remarried in 1882 to Julia St. Felix Thom. They had three children including  Judge Sidney St. Felix Thaxter.   Actress Phyllis Thaxter was his granddaughter.

He died in Portland, Maine in 1908 and is buried in Evergreen Cemetery.

Military
During the Civil War, Thaxter was a member of the 1st Maine Volunteer Cavalry Regiment, rising to the rank of major. He earned his Medal of Honor for his actions at the Battle of Boydton Plank Road in October 1864.  After the war, he became a companion of the Maine Commandery of the Military Order of the Loyal Legion of the United States.

Issued on September 10, 1897, his citation read "The President of the United States of America, in the name of Congress, takes pleasure in presenting the Medal of Honor to Major Sidney Warren Thaxter, United States Army, for extraordinary heroism on 27 October 1864, while serving with 1st Maine Cavalry, in action at Hatcher's Run, Virginia. Major Thaxter voluntarily remained and participated in the battle with conspicuous gallantry, although his term of service had expired and he had been ordered home to be mustered out."

References

1839 births
1908 deaths
People of Maine in the American Civil War
American Civil War recipients of the Medal of Honor
United States Army Medal of Honor recipients
People from Bangor, Maine
Military personnel from Portland, Maine
Burials at Evergreen Cemetery (Portland, Maine)